The New Directors' Showcase, established in 1991, is an award category at the Cannes Lions International Festival of Creativity.

It is intended to discover new directorial talent and is organised by Saatchi & Saatchi.

References 

Advertising awards
Awards established in 1991
Cannes